Ofa Fainga'anuku (born 5 December 1982) is a Tongan rugby union player. He plays as a loosehead prop for Bayonne in the Pro D2.

He has represented Tonga internationally and the Central Coast Rays and Eastern Suburbs in Australian domestic competitions. Ofa has also gone on to coach Eastern Suburbs 2nds Colts reaching a Semi Final in is first year.

Reference List 

1982 births
Tongan rugby union players
Tonga international rugby union players
Glasgow Warriors players
Rugby union props
Tongan expatriate rugby union players
Expatriate rugby union players in Australia
Expatriate rugby union players in Scotland
Expatriate rugby union players in England
Tongan expatriate sportspeople in Australia
Tongan expatriate sportspeople in England
Tongan expatriate sportspeople in Scotland
Living people